Khutar is a town and a nagar panchayat in Shahjahanpur district in the Indian state of Uttar Pradesh.

History
Khutar part of erstwhile Nahil estate at the time of Rao Gopal Singh who was the then ruler of Nahil. It  later came under one of the descendants of Rao Gopal Singh, Raja Gopal Shah Judeo after the division of property and power. He was the elder brother of Kunwar Shambhu Shah of Jewan. Present ruler of Khutar is Raja Vijay Shah Judeo (titles and kingdoms abolished in 1971 by the Government of India).

Khutar Garhi
Khutar Garhi, also called fort of Khutar, is a multi-acre palace where descendants of erstwhile royal family of Khutar's King Gopal Shah live. Present family of Raja Vijay Shah and Rajkumar Raghvendra Shah lives there.

Surrounding
The surrounding nearby villages and its distance from Silhua and Pipariya Bhagwant 1.4 KM, Shihura Khurd Kalan 8 KM, Rajmana 2.6 KM, Malika 2.7 KM, Rautapur Kalan 3 KM, Itauwa 3.1 KM, Athkona 3.5 KM, Khutar 3.7 KM, Tah Khurd Kalan 4.1 KM, Piparia Birsinghpur 4.2 KM, Raswan Kalan 4.5 KM, Kuiyan 5.1 KM, Nawazpur 5.2 KM, Chamra Bojhi 5.4 KM, Garhia Sareli 5.8 KM, Lakshmipur 6.1 KM, Gurghiya 6.5 KM, Chappa Bojhi 7.3 KM, Muradpur Nibiakhera 7.8 KM, Karhaiyamaichaknk 8.7 KM, Sihura Khurd Kalan 8.8 KM, Saharu Singhpur 9.1 KM, Todarpur T. Khutar 9.3 KM, Dhansinghpur 11.6 KM, Sarai 11.7 KM, Navadia Nawazpur 13.3 KM, Larti 13.6 KM, Harraipur 13.6 KM, Kolhugarha 15 KM, Barhaipur 16 KM, Harnahai 16 KM, Bela 17 KM, Jadhopur Kalan 17.5 KM, Hanshpur 17.6 KM, Navadia Darudgara 17.9 KM, Kamriya, Hariharpur, Khandsar .

Gallery
Descendants of the Rulers of Khutar —

Geography
It has an average elevation of 162 metres (531 feet). Dudhwan National Park is 70 km away and Gola Gokhran Nath (Chota Kashi) is 25 km away.

Demographics
 India census, Khutar had a population of 14,219. Males constitute 53% of the population and females 47%. Khutar has an average literacy rate of 51%, lower than the national average of 59.5%: male literacy is 60%, and female literacy is 40%. In Khutar, 18% of the population is under 6 years of age.

See also
Jewan
Powayan

References

Cities and towns in Shahjahanpur district